R522 road may refer to:
 R522 road (Ireland)
 R522 (South Africa)